Lonely Island is a 2014 Chinese suspense thriller horror film directed by Lian Tao and Wang Kunhao. It was released on October 31.

Cast
Li Yiyi
Tian Suhao
Mao Yi

Reception
By November 3, the film had earned ¥2.46 million at the Chinese box office.

References

2014 horror thriller films
2014 horror films
Chinese horror thriller films
2014 films